The 2009 Beijing International Challenge (also known as the 2009 BTV Cup) was a professional non-ranking snooker tournament that took place between 7–12 July 2009 at the Beijing University Students' Gymnasium in Beijing, China.

Liang Wenbo won his first professional title by beating Stephen Maguire 7–6.

Prize fund
The breakdown of prize money for this year is shown below:
Winner: £50,000
Runner-up: £25,000
Semi-final: £7,500
Highest break: £2,500

Round-robin stage

Group 1

Table

Results:
 Jin Long  0–3 Ali Carter
 Stephen Hendry 0–3 Liang Wenbo
 Liang Wenbo 3–0 Ali Carter
 Stephen Hendry 3–2 Ali Carter
 Jin Long 3–1 Liang Wenbo
 Jin Long 1–3 Stephen Hendry

Group 2

Table

Results:
 Marco Fu 0–3 Stephen Maguire
 Stephen Maguire 3–1 Mark Allen
 Marco Fu 3–1 Tian Pengfei
 Tian Pengfei 3–2 Mark Allen
 Tian Pengfei 0–3 Stephen Maguire
 Marco Fu 2–3 Mark Allen

Knock-out stage

Century breaks

 138, 123  Liang Wenbo
 103  Stephen Maguire

References

2009
Beijing International Challenge
Beijing International Challenge
July 2009 sports events in China